Wieratal is a former Verwaltungsgemeinschaft ("collective municipality") in the district Altenburger Land, in Thuringia, Germany. The seat of the Verwaltungsgemeinschaft was in Langenleuba-Niederhain. It was disbanded in July 2018.

The Verwaltungsgemeinschaft Wieratal consisted of the following municipalities:

Frohnsdorf 
Göpfersdorf
Jückelberg 
Langenleuba-Niederhain
Ziegelheim

Former Verwaltungsgemeinschaften in Thuringia